The Penske PC-17 was a CART Penske Racing car which was constructed for competition in the 1988 season. The car was designed by Nigel Bennett. The chassis swept the front row at the 1988 Indianapolis 500 with Rick Mears winning the pole position, Danny Sullivan qualifying second and Al Unser, Sr. third. Mears went on to win the Indy 500 and Sullivan the season championship.

The PC-17 ushered in a new era of success for the Penske chassis program, which had suffered in the past few seasons of competition.

Complete Indy Car World Series results
(key) (Results in bold indicate pole position) 

*Includes points scored by other cars.

External links
 penskeracing.com

Indianapolis 500
Team Penske
American Championship racing cars